1884 in sports describes the year's events in world sport.

Athletics
USA Outdoor Track and Field Championships

American football
College championship
 College football national championship – Yale Bulldogs 
Events
 Amos Alonzo Stagg enters Yale University as a divinity student and, a natural athlete, joins the university's football team.
 25 October — Yale Bulldogs defeat Dartmouth 113–0.  This is the first college football game where one team scores over 100 points and also the first time one team scores over 100 points while the opposing team scores zero.  
 29 October — The next week, the Princeton Tigers outscore the Lafayette Leopards by 140–0.

Association football
England
 FA Cup final – Blackburn Rovers 2–1 Queen's Park (Glasgow) at The Oval.  Blackburn Rovers is the first extant club to win the FA Cup.
 Everton moves as tenant to Anfield, a newly enclosed ground off Anfield Road, Liverpool.
 Derby County founded by Derbyshire CCC to provide a winter activity for players and supporters.
 Leicester City founded as Leicester Fosse.
Scotland
 Scottish Cup final – Queen's Park win by a walkover after Vale of Leven fail to appear

Baseball
National championship
 Inauguration of the National League v. American Association fixture, sometimes called the "Original World Series" – Providence Grays (NL) defeats New York Metropolitans (AA) 3 games to nil.
Events
 Ned Williamson hits 27 home runs for the Chicago White Stockings, establishing a record that will last for 35 years. He nearly doubles the record of 14 set the season before by Harry Stovey.
 Moses Fleetwood Walker becomes the first black American major league baseball player when he makes his American Association league debut for the Toledo Blue Stockings.

Boxing
Events
 The first of the modern World titles is recognised with Jack (Nonpareil) Dempsey as the original World Middleweight Champion.  The weight limit for middleweights at this time is 154 pounds.  Dempsey will hold the title until 1891.
 American heavyweight champion John L. Sullivan faces a number of challengers but none of them last more than four rounds.  Sullivan is very active on the exhibition circuit.
Lineal world champions
 World Middleweight Championship – Jack Nonpareil Dempsey

Canadian football
Events
 The Canadian Rugby Football Union, forerunner of the Canadian Football League, is established.

Cricket
Events
 An Australian team tours England but loses the three-match Test series 1–0 with two matches drawn.
 Derbyshire suffer the ignominy of a perfectly bad season losing all ten of their county games
 In stark contrast Nottinghamshire come closer to an absolutely perfect season than any county side since, winning nine games and being three wickets shy of victory in their tenth
England
 Champion County –  Nottinghamshire
 Most runs – Lord Harris 1,417 @ 33.73 (HS 112*)
 Most wickets – Fred Spofforth 207 @ 12.82 (BB 8–62)
Australia
 Most runs – Billy Murdoch 567 @ 113.40 (HS 279*)
 Most wickets – Joey Palmer 29 @ 17.51 (BB 6–72)

Gaelic Athletic Association
Events
 1 November — Gaelic Athletic Association is founded at Hayes' Hotel in Thurles, County Tipperary, to promote hurling and Gaelic football.  The foundation date has significance as Samhain: according to legend the day the Fianna fell from power.

Golf
Major tournaments
 British Open – Jack Simpson

Horse racing
England
 Grand National – Voluptuary
 1,000 Guineas Stakes – Busybody
 2,000 Guineas Stakes – Scot Free
 The Derby – dead heat between Harvester and St. Gatien
 The Oaks – Busybody
 St. Leger Stakes – The Lambkin
Australia
 Melbourne Cup – Malua
Canada
 Queen's Plate – Williams
Ireland
 Irish Grand National – The Gift (second successive win)
 Irish Derby Stakes – Theologian
USA
 Kentucky Derby – Buchanan
 Preakness Stakes – Knight of Ellerslie
 Belmont Stakes – Panique

Ice hockey
 February 11 – The Montreal Victorias defeat the Ottawa Hockey Club 1–0 to win the second Montreal Winter Carnival ice hockey tournament.
 November 28 – The Montreal Hockey Club is founded.

Rowing
The Boat Race
 7 April — Cambridge wins the 41st Oxford and Cambridge Boat Race

Rugby football
Home Nations Championship
 The 2nd series is won by England
Other events
 The 1884 New Zealand rugby union tour of New South Wales is the inaugural overseas tour by the New Zealand team

Tennis
Events
 Inaugural women's singles championship at Wimbledon
England
 Wimbledon Men's Singles Championship – William Renshaw (GB) defeats Herbert Lawford (GB) 6–0 6–4 9–7
 Wimbledon Women's Singles Championship – Maud Watson (GB) defeats Lillian Watson (GB) 6–8 6–3 6–3
USA
 American Men's Singles Championship – Richard D. Sears (USA) defeats Howard A. Taylor (USA) 6–0 1–6 6–0 6–2

World
 The 8th pre-open era Men's Tennis tour gets underway 54 tournaments are staged this year the tour runs from 6 May to 21 December 1884.

Tobogganing
Events
 Cresta Run constructed at St. Moritz in Switzerland

References

 
Sports by year